Build automation involves scripting or automating the process of compiling computer source code into binary code.  Below is a list of notable tools associated with automating build processes.

Make-based
 GNU make, a make implementation with a large set of extensions 
 make, a Unix build tool
 mk, developed originally for Version 10 Unix and Plan 9, and ported to Unix as part of plan9port
 MPW Make, developed for the classic Mac OS and similar to but not compatible with Unix make; the modern macOS (OS X) comes with both GNU make and BSD make; available as part of Macintosh Programmer's Workshop as a free, unsupported download from Apple
 nmake
 PVCS-make, follows the concept of make but with additional syntax features

Make-incompatible
 Apache Ant, popular for Java platform development and uses an XML file format
 Apache Buildr, historic open-source build system, Rake-based, gives the full power of scripting in Ruby with integral support for most abilities wanted in a build system
 Apache Maven, a Java platform tool for dependency management and automated software build
 ASDF LISP build system for building LISP projects
 A-A-P, a Python-based build tool
 Bazel, a portion of Blaze (Google's own build tool) written in Java, using Starlark (BUILD file syntax) to build projects in Java, C, C++, Go, Python, Objective-C, and others
 BitBake, a Python-based tool with the special focus of distributions and packages for embedded Linux cross-compilation
 Boot, a Java build and dependency management tool written in Clojure 
 boost.build For C++ projects, cross-platform, based on Perforce Jam
 Buck, a build system developed and used by Facebook, written in Java, using Starlark (BUILD file syntax) as Bazel
 Buildout, a Python-based build system for creating, assembling and deploying applications from multiple parts
 Cabal, a common architecture for building applications and libraries in the programming language Haskell
Dub, the official package and build manager of the D Language
 FinalBuilder, for Windows software developers. FinalBuilder provides a graphical IDE to both create and run build projects in a single application. The final builder also includes the ability the execute the unit test, deploy web projects or install and test applications.
 Flowtracer, a build management tool
 Gradle, an open-source build and automation system with an Apache Groovy-based domain specific language (DSL), combining features of Apache Ant and Apache Maven with additional features like a reliable incremental build
 Grunt, a build tool for front-end web development
 Gulp, a build tool for front-end web development
 IncrediBuild, a suite of grid computing software for compiling and building software
 Leiningen, a tool providing commonly performed tasks in Clojure projects, including build automation
 Mix, the Elixir build tool
 MSBuild, the Microsoft build engine
 NAnt, a tool similar to Ant for the .NET Framework
 Ninja, a small build system focused on speed by using build scripts generated by higher-level build systems
 Perforce Jam, a build tool by Perforce, inspired by Make
 Psake,  domain-specific language and build-automation tool written in PowerShell
 Qt Build System
 Rake, a Ruby-based build tool
 sbt, a build tool built on a Scala-based DSL
 SCons, Python-based, with integrated functionality similar to autoconf/automake
 Stack, a tool to build Haskell projects, manage their dependencies (compilers and libraries), and for testing and benchmarking.
 Visual Build, a graphical user interface software for software builds
 Waf, a Python-based tool for configuring, compiling and installing applications. It is a replacement for other tools such as Autotools, Scons, CMake or Ant

Build script generation

These  generator tools do not build directly, but rather generate files to be used by a native build tool (as the ones listed in the previous two sections).

 BuildAMation, a multi-platform tool, using a declarative syntax in C# scripts, that builds C/C++ code in a terminal using multiple threads, or generates project files for Microsoft Visual Studio, Xcode or MakeFiles.
 CMake generates files for various build tools, such as make, ninja, Apple's Xcode, and Microsoft Visual Studio. CMake is also directly used by some IDE as Qt Creator, KDevelop and GNOME Builder.
 GNU Build System  (aka autotools), a collection of tools for portable builds. These in particular include Autoconf and Automake, cross-unix-platform tools that together generate appropriate localized makefiles.
 GYP (Generate Your Projects) - Created for Chromium; it is another tool that generates files for the native build environment. It has been superseded by GN which generates files for ninja and other build systems.
 imake
 Meson, a build system optimized for performance and usability is based on ninja on Linux, Visual Studio on Windows and Xcode on macOS. Meson is also directly used by GNOME Builder.
 OpenMake Software Meister
 Premake, a Lua-based tool for making makefiles, Visual Studio files, Xcode projects, and more
 qmake

Continuous integration

 AnthillPro, build automation with pipeline support for deployment automation and testing. Cross-platform, cross-language
 Apache Continuum - discontinued
 Bamboo, continuous-integration software
 Bitbucket Pipelines and Deployments, continuous integration for Bitbucket hosted repositories
 Buildbot, a Python-based software development continuous-integration tool which automates the compile/test cycle
 CruiseControl, for Java and .NET
Go continuous delivery, open source, cross-platform
 GitLab (GitLab Runner),  continuous integration and git server
GitHub (GitHub Actions), free continuous integration service for open-source projects and git server
 Hudson, an extensible continuous-integration engine
 Jenkins, an extensible continuous-integration engine, forked from Hudson
 Spinnaker, open source multi-cloud continuous delivery service from Netflix and Google
 TeamCity
 Travis CI, a hosted continuous-integration service

Configuration management
 Ansible (Python-based)
 CFEngine
 Chef (Ruby-based)
 LCFG
 NixOS Declarative configuration model
 OpenMake Software Release Engineer
 Otter
 Puppet (Ruby-based)
 Salt (Python-based)
 Rex (Perl-based)

Meta-build
A meta-build tool is capable of building many different projects using a subset of existing build tools. Since these usually provide a list of packages to build, they are also often called package managers.

 Pkgsrc, Portage, MacPorts and other package managers derived from the BSD Ports Collection.
 Nix, functional package manager for Linux and macOS focusing on reproducible builds, used for the NixOS Linux distribution.
 Guix, functional package manager based on Nix, used for the GuixSD Linux distribution.
 Collective Knowledge, cross-platform package manager to rebuild software environment for research workflows
 Homebrew, package manager for macOS

Others
 checkinstall, checkinstall is a program that monitors an installation procedure and creates a standard package for your distribution.
 Open Build Service, a hosted service to help build packages for various Linux distributions

Licensing overview

References

Build automation
Lists of software